Bed o' Roses (1947 – January 5, 1953) was an American thoroughbred racehorse.

Bed o' Roses was a bay filly by Rosemont out of the mare Good Thing, by Discovery, owned and bred by Alfred G. Vanderbilt II's Sagamore Farm.  Trained by Bill Winfrey and ridden by Eric Guerin, she won the 1949 Grade 1 Matron Stakes for two-year-old fillies at Belmont Park plus eight other important races. At the end of the season, Bed o' Roses was named the American Champion Two-Year-Old Filly.

Racing as a three-year-old, Bed o' Roses defeated a quality field including colts in the 1 5/8 mile Lawrence Realization Stakes and finished second in the Travers Stakes and the Arlington Classic.  After recovering from an injury that kept her out of racing for seven months, Bed o' Roses returned to win two more important races en route to being voted Champion Handicap Filly for the year.  She continued to race at ages four and five, retiring after three races in 1952.

However, she suddenly died a few months later on January 5, 1953 from an organic disorder.

Bed o' Roses is buried at Sagamore Farm, Maryland.

In 1976, she was inducted in the National Museum of Racing and Hall of Fame.

External links
 Bed o' Roses pedigree
 Bed o'Roses at the National Museum of Racing and Hall of Fame

1947 racehorse births
1953 racehorse deaths
Thoroughbred family 12-c
American Champion racehorses
Racehorses bred in California
Racehorses trained in the United States